Aristolochia tomentosa is a species of flowering plant in the family Aristolochiaceae.

Its native range includes the southeastern and South Central United States.  The common name for the plant is woolly Dutchman's-pipe because the flower superficially resembles a Dutch smoking pipe.

References

C. Neinhuis, S. Wanke1, K. W. Hilu, K. Müller and T. Borsch, (2004). Phylogeny of Aristolochiaceae based on parsimony, likelihood, and Bayesian analyses of trnL-trnF sequences. 	Plant Systematics and Evolution, 	Volume 250, Numbers 1-2. pp. 7–26.
http://www.missouribotanicalgarden.org/PlantFinder/PlantFinderDetails.aspx?kempercode=w820

tomentosa
Flora of Alabama